Hrvoje Štrok (born 14 July 1980) is a Croatian retired football midfielder and current coach.

Club career
Štrok previously played for HNK Gorica, NK Sesvete, NK Zagreb, GNK Dinamo Zagreb, NK Inter Zaprešić and HNK Rijeka.

Career statistics

Honours
Zagreb
Prva HNL (1): 2001–02

Dinamo Zagreb
Croatian Cup (1): 2004

Individual
HNK Rijeka top goalscorer - 2010–11

References

1980 births
Living people
Footballers from Zagreb
Association football midfielders
Croatian footballers
NK Zagreb players
GNK Dinamo Zagreb players
NK Inter Zaprešić players
HNK Rijeka players
NK Sesvete players
HNK Gorica players
NK Hrvatski Dragovoljac players
Croatian Football League players